Elvia Josefina Amador Muñoz (born 1 May 1948) is a Honduran politician. She served as deputy of the National Congress of Honduras representing the Liberal Party of Honduras for Olancho during the 2006–2010 term.

References

1948 births
Living people
Deputies of the National Congress of Honduras
Liberal Party of Honduras politicians
People from Olancho Department
21st-century Honduran women politicians
21st-century Honduran politicians